Ganjabad-e Olya (also Romanized as Ganjābād-e ‘Olyā; also known as Ganjābād-e Bālā) is a village in Nazarkahrizi Rural District, Nazarkahrizi District, Hashtrud County, East Azerbaijan Province, Iran. At the 2006 census, its population was 142, in 23 families.

References 

Towns and villages in Hashtrud County